Bricquebec-en-Cotentin (literally Bricquebec in Cotentin) is a commune in the department of Manche, northwestern France. The municipality was established on 1 January 2016 by merger of the former communes of Bricquebec (the seat), Les Perques, Quettetot, Saint-Martin-le-Hébert, Le Valdécie and Le Vrétot.

Geography

Climate
Bricquebec-en-Cotentin has a oceanic climate (Köppen climate classification Cfb).

Population
The population data given in the table below refer to the commune in its geography as of January 2020.

See also 
Communes of the Manche department

References 

Communes of Manche
Populated places established in 2016
2016 establishments in France